Miáo (苗) is a Chinese language surname. In 2013 it was counted as the 157th most common surname with 1 million people sharing the name or 0.075% of the total population, the province with the largest population of people with the name is Henan. It is the 53rd name on the Hundred Family Surnames poem.

Notable people
 Nora Miao (stagename, Chinese: 苗可秀, born 陳詠憫 1952-) is a Hong Kong actress who appeared in many kung-fu films in the 1970s
 Miao Miao (Chinese: 苗苗; pinyin: Miáo Miao) (born 14 January 1981, Tianjin, China) is an Australian table tennis player who represented Australia at the Sydney, Athens, Beijing and London Olympic Games
 Miao Wei (Chinese: 苗圩; born May 1955) is a politician and business executive of the People's Republic of China. He is the Minister of Industry and Information Technology and former Communist Party Chief of Wuhan, capital of Hubei province
 Vivi Miao (born 29 November 1988), also known as Miao Miao, is a Chinese actress.
 Miao Pu (born 22 February 1977) is a Chinese actress.

References

Chinese-language surnames
Individual Chinese surnames